Zitro International S.A.R.L is a company providing gambling machines for land-based and digital games for online casinos. Its headquarter is in Luxembourg, with additional offices in Spain, North and Latin America, the Philippines, and Malta.

History 
Zitro was founded in 2007 by Johnny Ortiz. The Video Bingo product line has been in operation since Zitro's inception. Later the company introduced Multi-Game and Multi-Progressive Video Slots (88 Link, Link King, Link Me).

In 2016, Zitro introduced its first Video Slot games, a customized system for BET bingo halls, and its attachment to the online market through the Zitro Digital division.

In December 2019, Zitro's 88 Link Wild Duels won "Slot machine of the year" at the BEGE Awards 2019. In June 2021, Zitro won "Best video bingo supplier" at SAGSE Awards 2020. In March 2022, at the International Gaming Fair of Madrid (FIJMA), Zitro launched four new games available for gaming halls and the bingo market.

In November 2022, Zitro joined a solidarity "Food Bank Campaign" to donate food and toys to support charities. In 2023, Zitro casino machines were installed in the first casino in Andorra's history.

Controversies 
Zitro was a part of Belgium gambling scandal in 2017 with local police involved.

See also 

 Novomatic

References 

Gambling companies